The Souq al Arabi is the largest open-air market in Khartoum, Sudan.

Structure and size 

The market is spread over several blocks in the center of Khartoum proper, just south of the Great Mosque (Masjid al-Kabir) and the minibus station. Sellers are located in sections according to the type of goods they offer.

References

Further reading 

 

Khartoum
Retail markets in Sudan